Gustavo Montini (16 September 1920 – 22 September 2004) is an Italian lawyer and politician who served as Mayor of Pordenone (1956–1967), Senator (1968–1976), and Undersecretary of State for Defense in the Andreotti II Cabinet (1972–1973).

References

1920 births
2004 deaths
Mayors of Pordenone
Christian Democracy (Italy) politicians
Italian People's Party (1994) politicians
Senators of Legislature V of Italy
Senators of Legislature VI of Italy